Assize is a word sometimes used in Scots law to mean a trial by jury.

References

Statutory law by country
Scots law